Roag is a Pakistani television drama series produced by Babar Javed and Asif Raza Mir under the banner of A&B Entertainment. It was directed by Javed, and was written by Faiza Iftikhar, whose novel of the same name it was based on. It premiered on ARY Digital on 16 April 2011.

It revolves around the struggle of a family who suffers a lot as one of the children was abused sexually. It features Faysal Qureshi, Sumbal Iqbal, Asif Raza Mir, Mohib Mirza, Yamina Peerzada, and Shagufta Ejaz. It ended on 27 August 2011 with a total of 20 episodes.

Plot 

The plot follows the story of a house where parental neglect leads to the abuse of a child of the house. The series talks about the aftermaths and consequences of the this trauma that the child suffers her entire life until she reaches adolescence.

Cast 
 Asif Raza Mir as Abid
 Faysal Qureshi as Ayaz
 Arisha Razi / Sumbul Iqbal as Nimra "Nimmo"
 Shagufta Ejaz as Humaira
 Rida Asfahani
 Sara Umair as Sameera
 Mohib Mirza as Faiq
 Yamina Peerzada
 Lubna Aslam
 Qaiser Naqvi as Humaira's mother
 Seemi Pasha
 Sajid Shah
 Kanwar Arsalan

Awards

References 

Pakistani drama television series
2011 Pakistani television series debuts
2011 Pakistani television series endings
2011 in Pakistani television